This is a list of Brazilian films of the 1930s. For a complete alphabetical list, see :Category:Brazilian films.

1930
List of Brazilian films of 1930

1931
List of Brazilian films of 1931

1932
List of Brazilian films of 1932

1933
List of Brazilian films of 1933

1934
List of Brazilian films of 1934

1935
List of Brazilian films of 1935

1936
List of Brazilian films of 1936

1937
List of Brazilian films of 1937

1938
List of Brazilian films of 1938

1939
List of Brazilian films of 1939

Brazilian
Films